The Last Sucker is the eleventh studio album by industrial metal band Ministry, released in 2007 through 13th Planet Records. For three years until their reformation in 2011, it was the band's last studio album featuring new material.

The album is the third and final part of the band's anti-George W. Bush trilogy, preceded by 2004's Houses of the Molé and 2006's Rio Grande Blood.

Overview
Jourgensen told Billboard that he had "...other things to do. I just started a label (13th Planet Records), and I want to sign some bands and really build it up like I did with WaxTrax in the '80s, not just a vanity label. I think it's time, and I'll be leaving on the top of my game instead of hanging on too long and doing crappy Aerosmith and Rolling Stones albums thirty years later."

"That seems to be my muse; everyone seems to think I write real shitty music when a Democrat's in office. So we'll do that one, and then me and George (W.) Bush go riding off hand-in-hand, into the sunset."

Fear Factory frontman Burton C. Bell recorded some guest vocals for the album.

On July 17, 2007, a promotional copy of the album was leaked on the internet. A week earlier lyrics and full credits for the album were released by SureShotWorx on their official website.

A Best Buy exclusive version of the CD contains remixes of "Watch Yourself" and "The Last Sucker."

The final track, "End of Days Part Two", contains a lengthy sample from 34th President of the United States Dwight Eisenhower's farewell address, warning about the dangers of the "military-industrial complex". The end of the song also features a quiet sample of "O Fortuna" in the background.  The same music was sampled at the beginning of the first album in the Bush Trilogy, Houses of the Molé.

In an interview with Songfacts from 2012, Jourgensen reflected on the political aspect of the album:

"By the end of Last Sucker, I actually felt guilty and bad about bashing Bush. In Rio Grande Blood, I was all into it: this guy's evil. But by the end of Last Sucker, I was just like, this guy is in over his head. The oligarchy rules, and this guy plays with crayons and reads My Pet Goat. I mean, he's a blithering idiot. I protested him here in El Paso one time. I got within 10 feet of him. I can't believe the Secret Service let me get that close. And he was at a taco stand, like, 'I'll take one of them there enchiritos.' Well, there was no enchirito on the menu, and I don't even know what an enchirito is. But George W. was insistent, so they made him an enchirito, and I got to witness the whole thing and I started feeling sorry for him. What a dolt, man. This guy is so stupid, he can't be running the country. Cheney and the oligarchy is running the country. This guy just plays with Tonka trucks and orders enchiritos. I actually felt sorry for him."

Cover art
The limited edition digipak has an image of George W. Bush's face that morphs into a lizard creature's face and back when turned. The image is on a card that can be removed from the digipack.

The inner cover art contains a parody of Leonardo da Vinci's The Last Supper, with Jourgensen in the center of the table and figures from the Bush administration around him; Bush himself is drawn in Philip the Apostle's place.

Track listing

Personnel

Ministry
Alien Jourgensen - lead vocals, programming, guitars, bass (8), harmonica (8), drum programming (8), production
Paul Raven - bass (2, 10, 11), guitars (2, 10, 11), backing vocals (2, 10, 11)
Tommy Victor - guitars (5, 6, 9-11), bass (5, 6, 9-11), backing vocals (5, 6, 9-11)
Sin Quirin - guitars (1, 3, 4, 7), bass (1, 3, 4, 7)
John Bechdel - keyboards

Additional personnel
Burton C. Bell - vocals (9-11)
Josh Bradford - add. backing vocals (11)
Angie Jay - add. backing vocals (11)
Kevin Spence - intro vox (8) add. backing vocals (6-11)
Erin Braswell - add. backing vocals (11)
Dave Donnelly - production, mastering
John Bilberry - engineer, drum programming
Lawton Outlaw - art direction, design, layout

Chart positions

References

External links

2007 albums
Albums produced by Al Jourgensen
Ministry (band) albums
Cultural depictions of George W. Bush
Obscenity controversies in music